

The Roper Center for Public Opinion Research at Cornell University is the world's oldest archive of social science data and the largest specializing in data from public opinion surveys. It's collection includes over 24,000 datasets and more than 820,000 questions with responses in Roper iPoll, adding hundreds more each year. The archive contains responses from millions of individuals on a vast range of topics. The current executive director of the center is Jonathon P. Schuldt, Associate Professor of Communication at Cornell University, with a governing board of directors chaired by Robert Y. Shapiro of Columbia University.

The Roper Center focuses on surveys conducted by the news media and commercial polling firms; however, it also holds many academic surveys, including historical collections from Gallup, Pew Research Center, the National Opinion Research Center and Princeton University's Office of Public Opinion Research.

The Roper Center maintains cooperative relationships with other archives around the world. Its board of directors includes representatives from academic and commercial public opinion research. The Roper Center moved from the University of Connecticut to Cornell University in 2015.

Warren J. Mitofsky Award 
The Warren J. Mitofsky Award for Excellence in Public Opinion Research is named in honor of Warren Mitofsky. Previous winners:

 2007: John Mueller
 2008: Robert Blendon
 2009: Robert Wuthnow
 2010: James A. Davis
 2011: Kathleen Frankovic
 2012: Norman Bradburn
 2013: Eric Schickler and Adam Berinsky
 2014: Andrew Kohut
 2015: Daniel Yankelovich
 2016: James Stimson
 2017: Howard Schuman, Emeritus Professor at the University of Michigan, where he began his teaching career in 1964, and Emeritus research scientist at the University of Michigan’s Institute for Social Research’s Survey Research Center
 2018: Mollyann Brodie, Senior Vice President for Executive Operations and Executive Director, Public Opinion and Survey Research, at the Henry J. Kaiser Family Foundation (KFF)
 2019: Patricia Moy, Christy Cressey Professor of Communication and Associate Vice Provost for Academic and Student Affairs at the University of Washington
 2020: Karlyn Bowman, Senior Fellow at the American Enterprise Institute
 2021: Lawrence D. Bobo, Dean of Social Science and the W. E. B. Du Bois Professor of the Social Sciences at Harvard University
 2022: Kathleen Hall Jamieson, Elizabeth Ware Packard Professor at the Annenberg School for Communication of the University of Pennsylvania and director of the university’s Annenberg Public Policy Center, where she co-founded FactCheck.org

See also
Public opinion
Opinion poll
American Association for Public Opinion Research
National Digital Information Infrastructure and Preservation Program
Data curation
Digital preservation

References

External links
Roper Center for Public Opinion Research

1947 establishments in Connecticut
Cornell University
Preservation (library and archival science)
Data quality
Public opinion
Data and information organizations